Albert Nikolayevich Shcherbakov (born 27 May 1976) is a former Russian football player.

References

1976 births
Living people
Russian footballers
FC Sibir Novosibirsk players
FC Shinnik Yaroslavl players
Russian Premier League players
Association football defenders
FC Asmaral Moscow players